Phalangerida is one of the two former suborders of the large marsupial order Diprotodontia. This large and diverse suborder included kangaroos, wallabies, quokkas, possums, gliding possum-like marsupials and others. The much smaller suborder Vombatiformes encompasses only the koalas and wombats.  This suborder is no longer considered to accurately describe the diversity in Diprotodontia.

Phalangeriformes has come to replace Phalangerida but does not include the potoroos (Potoroidae), kangaroos and wallabies (Macropodidae) or the musky rat-kangaroo (Hypsiprymnodontidae).  These families are now placed in a new suborder named Macropodiformes.

References
Kear, B.P. & Cooke, B.N., 2001:12!20. A review of macropodoid systematics with the inclusion of a new family. Memoirs of the Association of Australasian Palaeontologists 25, 83–101. ISSN 0810-8889 

Diprotodonts
Obsolete mammal taxa

fr:Phalangerida